Kutner is a surname. Notable people with the surname include:

 Beverley Kutner (Beverley Martyn)
 Luis Kutner, American attorney and activist
 Malcolm Kutner, American football player
 Rob Kutner, American writer
 Lawrence Kutner (psychologist), American child and media psychologist
 Marc Kutner, Marc Stevens (pornographic actor)
 Yoav Kutner, Israeli music editor and producer

Fictional characters:
 Lawrence Kutner (House), fictional sports medicine specialist on the television program House

See also
 Kuttner, a surname
 Solomon Cutner (see Solomon (pianist))